Mama and Daddy is an album by Muhal Richard Abrams that was released on the Italian Black Saint label in 1980 and features performances of four of Abrams' compositions by a big band.

Reception
The Allmusic review calls the album "a first-rate big band/large group session from 1980, with Muhal Richard Abrams' compositions being played by a masterful ensemble... adventurous, disciplined, frequently exciting music". The Penguin Guide to Jazz awarded the album 3 stars, stating: "These albums seem even more compelling now than they did when they first came out, because it is clear where the leader's ideas are going". The Rolling Stone Jazz Record Guide said "His finest achievement in any format may be Mama and Daddy; this ambitious set of compositions for a ten piece group, with its masterful blends of brass, strings, and percussion, has a balance in its glowing execution and suggests black chamber music".

Track listing 
All compositions by Muhal Richard Abrams
 "Fafca" - 8:03 
 "Balu" - 7:41 
 "Malic" - 8:02 
 "Mama And Daddy" - 7:24
 Recorded June 16 & 19, 1980 at Platinum Factory Recording Studio, Brooklyn, New York

Personnel 
 Muhal Richard Abrams: piano, synthesizer, conductor
 Baikida Carroll: trumpet, flugelhorn
 Vincent Chancey: french horn
 George Lewis: trombone
 Wallace McMillan: alto saxophone, tenor saxophone, flute, congas
 Bob Stewart: tuba
 Leroy Jenkins: violin
 Brian Smith: bass
 Andrew Cyrille: percussion
 Thurman Barker: drums, marimba, percussion

References 

1980 albums
Muhal Richard Abrams albums
Black Saint/Soul Note albums